Jeffrey Ryan Locke (born September 27, 1989) is a former American football punter. He played college football at UCLA, and was drafted by the Minnesota Vikings in the fifth round of the 2013 NFL Draft.

High school career
Locke attended Mountain Ridge High School in Glendale, Arizona, where he played football as a punter, kicker, and wide receiver.  As a senior, Locke averaged 43.6 yards on 38 punts with 10 inside the 20-yard line, kicked 47 touchbacks on 54 kickoffs, converted 29 of 32 extra point attempts, and made 11 of 20 field goals.  He set school records for most field goals in a season (11), longest punt (71 yards), and longest field goal (63 yards, a state record).  For his efforts, Locke was ranked No. 1 kicker by ESPN.com and No. 1 nationally at punter by scout.com.

College career

Locke attended the University of California, Los Angeles and played for the UCLA Bruins football team from 2008 to 2012.  He did not see action in his first year but later became UCLA's starting punter and kickoff specialist for four seasons.  He made 53 career starts with a punting average of 44.23, No. 2 in UCLA history.  Locke also had a 42.54% touchback rate on kickoffs.  In 2011, Locke took over for field goal and extra point duties in a few games following an injury to UCLA's starting placekicker.  He went 2–3 on field goals, connecting from 49 and 51 as well as converting 6 of 9 extra point attempts.  In his senior year, Locke was named first-team All-Pac-12, earned first-team all-conference academic team honors, selected to play in the Senior Bowl college all-star game, and earned the Captain's Award.

Professional career

Minnesota Vikings

Following a successful collegiate career, Locke was drafted in the fifth round of the 2013 NFL Draft by the Minnesota Vikings.  This made Locke the highest-picked punter in franchise history.  NFL senior analyst Gil Brandt said that Locke, a left-footed punter, "is every bit as good as Bryan Anger," the punter selected in the third round by the Jacksonville Jaguars in the 2012 NFL Draft.  Locke was also noted for his kickoff abilities, having led the NCAA in touchbacks his senior year.

After competing with the Vikings' then current punter, veteran Chris Kluwe (8 seasons), Locke earned the starting job as Kluwe was released on May 6, 2013.  It is speculated that this move was made in order to make more room for the salary cap, as Kluwe was due 1.45 million in 2013.

Indianapolis Colts
On March 10, 2017, Locke signed with the Indianapolis Colts. On August 28, 2017, Locke was released by the Colts after losing the starting job to rookie Rigoberto Sanchez.

Detroit Lions
On September 12, 2017, Locke signed with the Detroit Lions after an injury to Kasey Redfern, who was signed to replace Sam Martin. On October 24, 2017, Locke was released by the Lions after Martin returned to practice .

San Francisco 49ers
On March 12, 2018, Locke signed with the San Francisco 49ers. He was released on August 31, 2018.

Arizona Hotshots
On January 20, 2019, Locke signed with the Arizona Hotshots of the Alliance of American Football. The league ceased operations in April 2019.

Personal life
Locke "got hooked on punting" after attending a camp run by former NFL punter Ray Guy when he was in high school. He listed former NFL punter Daniel Sepulveda as one of the players he most admired.

Locke graduated from UCLA with a grade-point average of 3.885 and a bachelor's degree in economics.  While at school, he spent some of his time researching athletic scholarships and helped his teammates set up personal budgets.

References

External links

UCLA Bruins football bio
Minnesota Vikings bio

1989 births
Living people
Sportspeople from Frankfurt
Sportspeople from Glendale, Arizona
Players of American football from Arizona
American football punters
UCLA Bruins football players
Minnesota Vikings players
Indianapolis Colts players
Detroit Lions players
San Francisco 49ers players
Arizona Hotshots players